{{Infobox beauty pageant|photo=|broadcaster=Channel 3 (Thailand)|withdraws=|returns=|next=2014|before=2012|photogenic=Nethnapada Kanlayanon|congeniality=Carolina Medina|best national costume=Arisa Kim|venue=Pattaya, Thailand|caption=|placements=10|entrants=25|acts=Kevin BalotMiss International Queen 2012|presenters=Puwanart KunpalinSaraichatt Jirapaet|date=1 November 2013|winner=Marcela Ohio|debuts=}}Miss International Queen 2013''', the ninth Miss International Queen pageant, was held on November 1, 2013, at Pattaya City in Thailand. Kevin Balot of the Philippines crowned her successor, Marcela Ohio of Brazil at the end of the event.

Results

Special Awards

Best in Talent

Contestants 
25 contestants competed for the title.

References

External links 
 

2013 beauty pageants
2013
Beauty pageants in Thailand